Kala Keerthi Iranganie Roxanna Meedeniya, (9 June 1927), popularly as Iranganie Serasinghe, is an actress in Sri Lankan cinema, theater and television. Since her debut in Rekava, Serasinghe has become recognized for playing motherly figures in various films and television serials. She is the aunt of President Ranil Wickramasinghe.

Early life and education 
She was born on 9 June 1927 in Mudungomuwa, Ruwanwella, Sri Lanka to Joseph Hercules Meedeniya, Rate Mahatmaya of Ratnapura and Violet Ellawela. Her paternal grandfather was J. H. Meedeniya Adigar was elected unopposed to the Ruwanwella seat in the State Council and her uncles included D. R. Wijewardena and Sir Francis Molamure. Her mother was the sister of Nanda Ellawala's father who was a Member of Parliament for Ratnapura. She had three siblings, Indrani Meedeniya, Kamani Vitharana who married Professor Tissa Vitharana and Mahinda Meedeniya.

Her early touches with nature later led her to become an environmental activist. While attending Bishop's College she played in several end-of-term plays; at Girls' High School, Kandy whilst pursuing a HSC; Meedeniya took a leading role in Bernard Shaw's Pygmalion. Against her father a Rate Mahatthaya's wishes, Meedeniya entered the University of Ceylon in 1947 with the support of her cousins. He died in her first year away at a time when Marxist ideas were the norm. She immersed herself in the Ceylon theater scene while there under the guidance of Professor E. F. C. Ludowyk; she also became a proficient dancer with lessons from Chitrasena.

She was the first student to study drama at the Royal Academy of Dramatic Art in London and The Bristol Old Vic Theate School under the guidance of Professor Ludowyk. She eventually graduated with an Arts degree and traveled to London with letters of recommendation from Ludowyk following a marriage to Professor Dissanayake (they divorced some time later). There with the help of actresses Flora Robson and Sybil Thorndike, Meedeniya attended Bristol Old Vic Theatre School for a year and the London School of Speech Training and Dramatic Art for two years.

She was first married to a contemporary student at the university and later became a specialist dentist, Professor S. B. Dissanayake. That marriage did not last long. She was then married to fellow actor Winston Serasinghe, during playing English stage plays. There was a 17 year age gap between the two. Winston had appeared in Rekava and some other productions with her. The couple had two sons: Ravi & Ranjit. Her son Ravi died by an accident at the age of 31. Her husband Winston died in 1999.

Career
Returning to Sri Lanka, Meedeniya met up with Ludowyk and Austrian Jew director Neuman Jubal and got back into theater. The Lionel Wendt Art Centre theater portion of the center opened on 12 December 1953 with the production of Maxim Gorky's "The Lower Depths", starring Iranganie Serasinghe and produced by Neuman Jubal. Doing mainly English roles at first, she started playing  in Sinhala theater in Henry Jayasena's  Apata Puthe Magak Nethe and followed with roles in Damma Jagoda's Sinhala version of A Streetcar Named Desire, Ves Muhunu, and Porisadaya. The following years saw Meedeniya in constantly changing settings–teaching briefly at Musaeus College, working for The Times of Ceylon after returning from London, doing a stint at the SLBC and handling a post in the tourist trade working as a junior executive and guide of Walkers Tours and Travels (Pvt)Ltd. Accordingly, Serasinghe is the first Sri Lankan actress to have received an academic training in acting.

Meedeniya started her career in cinema in Lester James Peries "Be Safe or Be Sorry" for the Government Film Unit. Peries subsequently cast her in his debut feature film Rekava as a mother, 'Kathirinahamy'. In 1956, she won the Deepashikha Award for Best Actress for her debut performance in the film. With the new surname, Iranganie Serasinghe achieved fame as an actress appearing in many of Peries' early works. Later she won the Sarasaviya Award for Best Supporting Actress for her performance in the film Sagarayak Meda in 1982. Her next notable character came through the film Sudu Sewaneli directed by Sunil Ariyaratne where she played the character of a poor old mother. In 2000, she won the Presidential Award for Best Supporting Actress for this role. In 2021, she was honored with lifetime achievement award during the ceremony held for 21 artists who made an invaluable contribution to Sinhala cinema in the early decades of Sinhala Cinema.

Beyond Drama
Prior to entering the film industry, she was the editor-in-chief of the Times of Ceylon. As a revolutionary political figure, Iranganie was a communist militant at university. As a result, Peter Kehnemann, Bernard Zoysa, and Doric de Souza became active in politics at a time when Colvin R. De Silva has repeatedly invited her to contest a seat from the Lanka Sama Samaja Party.

National Awards
Kala Keerthi - Sri Lankan Government 
Sri Lankan of the Year (2017) - Entertainment Distinguished Achievement - Ada Derana 
 Best actress Special jury award - State Radio Awards 2019

Biography
 Irangani as Told to Kumar de Silva - by Kumar de Silva
 අයිරාංගනී - Sinhala version by same author.

Filmography

Film

Television

References

External links 
Iranganie Serasinghe's SLMDb
Iranganie Serasinghe's Biography in Sinhala Cinema Database

Iranganie Serasinghe – personal website
 
Irangani Serasinghe's childhood photographs
රංගන විජිතයේ කිරුළු පළන් ආදරණීය මිත්තණිය අයිරාංගනී සේරසිංහ කියයි
යථාර්ථවාදී රංගනයක පුරෝගාමී නිළිය
අපතේ ගිය ඇගේ රූපණ ප්‍රතිභාව

1927 births
Living people
Sri Lankan film actresses
Alumni of the University of Ceylon (Colombo)
Alumni of Bishop's College, Colombo
Alumni of Girls' High School, Kandy
Sri Lankan Roman Catholics
Sinhalese actresses
20th-century Sri Lankan actresses
21st-century Sri Lankan actresses
Kala Keerthi